John Fuller (c. 1679–1744) of Great Yarmouth, Norfolk was a British diplomat and  politician who sat in the House of Commons from 1728 to 1734

Fuller was the second, but eldest surviving son of Samuel Fuller, MP, merchant and mayor of Yarmouth, and his wife  Rose Huntington, daughter of Richard Huntington, MP. He was educated at Colchester and Yarmouth, and was admitted at Caius College, Cambridge on 14 May 1695, aged 15. In about 1718, he was appointed Consul at Leghorn. In 1721,  his father died, and in 1722 he resigned his post at Leghorn and returned to England.
 
Fuller stood at Yarmouth at the 1727 British general election challenging the Townshend-Walpole interest, but was unsuccessful. He was apparently bought off with a government seat at Plympton Erle where he was returned as Member of Parliament at a by-election on 29 February 1728. He  voted against the Administration in all recorded divisions. He did not stand again at the 1734 British general election.

Fuller was probably unmarried and died on 22 March 1744.

References

1670s births
1744 deaths
Members of the Parliament of Great Britain for Plympton Erle
British MPs 1727–1734

Year of birth uncertain